The African jewelfish (Hemichromis bimaculatus), also known as jewel cichlid or jewelfish, is from the family Cichlidae.

Description
H. bimaculatus are red with fine "jewel-like" blue spots and three dark spots on the sides, the first on the opercle, the second in the middle of the body, the third at the base of the tail.

These colorful fishes are popular among fishkeepers, but they are unsuitable for typical community aquariums because of their aggressive territorial behavior, especially when breeding.

Distribution and habitat 
The species originates from West Africa (hence its name), with additional reports (possibly other Hemichromis species) from Middle Africa and the Nile Basin. These fishes are found in rivers, stream and canals, especially in forested regions where vegetation overhangs the water surface.

It has often been reported that H. bimaculatus, the true African jewelfish, is found throughout a large part of Africa, but this is–at least in part–because of taxonomic uncertainty. It is certainly found in West Africa, but it remains unclear if it is the same species in Middle Africa and the Nile Basin.

The same confusion exists elsewhere, as Hemichromis have been introduced to regions far from their native Africa. For example, it has commonly been reported that the true African jewelfish, H. bimaculatus, is the species introduced to the United States, specifically Florida (and spreading), but this involves the related H. letourneuxi. Another relative that has become popular in the aquarium trade is H. lifalili, but it is easily recognized by lacking a dark spot at the base of the tail.

In the aquarium

Water parameters
The African jewelfish needs slightly acidic water (generally pH 6.0–7.8) and warm water in order to thrive in captivity. Because of the aggressive territorial behavior, it is often recommended keeping the species alone, but in large aquariums they can be kept with Congo tetras, Synodontis catfish and other robust species. Nevertheless, while breeding it is generally recommended that the pair is isolated.

Reproduction

When the African jewelfish is ready to breed, females will turn a deep red color to let the male know.  The male and female will bond or jawlock and the male will release sperm on the eggs.  The female will then lay the eggs on a flat surface.  The female will protect her eggs and will kill anything that comes in close proximity.  In a couple of days the eggs will hatch and the female will still protect them.  The female can reproduce every three weeks.
Jewel fish are 3 to 4 to 10 cm long.

Diet

The African Jewelfish are omnivorous. They feed on insects, crustaceans, and Caridina. Caridina are associated with shrimps and prawns. African Jewelfish can also eat some plants, such as algae and other weeds, as well as debris. When in captivity, African jewelfish can live on a varied diet of commercial frozen, live, flakes, and pellets as they usually accept mostly all forms of fish food. They also eat algae wafers and shrimp pellets. They can be easily compared to the bottom feeding fish in an aquarium, as they like to eat the algae and other debris that forms in the fish tank. African jewelfish are also known to eat their own young practicing filial cannibalism. They also enjoy live shrimp and do sometimes bite fingers.

References

Aquarium Life

Further reading

 Robins, Richard C., Reeve M. Bailey, Carl E. Bond, James R. Brooker, Ernest A. Lachner, et al. (1980). A List of Common and Scientific Names of Fishes from the United States and Canada, Fourth Edition. American Fisheries Society Special Publication, no. 12. American Fisheries Society .Bethesda, Maryland.
 Riehl, R., and H. A. Baensch. (1989). Aquarium Atlas. Hans A. Baensch. Melle, Germany. . 
https://web.archive.org/web/20061022135111/http://www.aquariumfish.com/aquariumfish/Breed_Profiles.aspx?aid=6263&cid=3680&search=
Aqualand Fact Sheets

African jewelfish
Fishkeeping
Freshwater fish of West Africa
African jewelfish
African jewelfish